Talesh Mahalleh (also Romanized as Ţālesh Maḩalleh; also known as Jabānesh Maḩalleh) is a village in Katra Rural District, Nashta District, Tonekabon County, Mazandaran Province, Iran. At the 2006 census, its population was 507, in 143 families.

References 

Populated places in Tonekabon County